Ceratomantis yunnanensis is a species of praying mantis native to China that was undiscovered until 1986.

See also
List of mantis genera and species

References

Ceratomantis
Insects of China
Insects described in 1986